
De Winton & Co was a Welsh locomotive factory.

De Winton may also refer to:

De Winton, Alberta
De Winton/South Calgary Airport
RCAF Station De Winton

Animals 

De Winton's shrew
De Winton's golden mole
De Winton's Long-eared Bat

People with the surname

Alice De Winton
Dora De Winton
Francis de Winton British army officer, administrator of  Congo Free State. 
Frederick de Winton
Henry de Winton
William Edward de Winton
The De Winton family, a family from Wallsworth Hall in England

People with the middle name

Winton Aldridge, complete name Rowland De Winton Aldridge
Roger Winlaw, complete name Roger de Winton Kelsall Winlaw